The John Day River is a tributary of the Columbia River, approximately  long, in northeastern Oregon in the United States. It is known as the Mah-Hah River by the Cayuse people, the original inhabitants of the region. Undammed along its entire length, the river is the fourth longest free-flowing river in the contiguous United States. There is extensive use of its waters for irrigation. Its course furnishes habitat for diverse species, including wild steelhead and Chinook salmon runs. However, the steelhead populations are under federal Endangered Species Act (ESA) protections, and the Chinook salmon have been proposed for such protection.

The river was named for John Day, a member of the Pacific Fur Company's overland expedition to the mouth of the Columbia River that left Missouri in 1810. Day struggled through eastern Oregon during the winter of 1811–12. While descending the Columbia River in April 1812, he and Ramsay Crooks were robbed and stripped naked by Native Americans at the mouth of the river that now bears his name, forcing them to hike  back to friendly Umatilla Indians under extreme conditions.

The absence of dams on the river causes its flow to greatly fluctuate throughout the year depending on snowpack and rainfall within the watershed. The lowest flow was no flow at all, which occurred on September 2, 1966; from August 15 to September 16, 1973; and on nine days in August 1977.

Drainage basin
Through its tributaries, the river drains much of the western side of the Blue Mountains, flowing across the sparsely populated arid part of the state east of the Cascade Range in a northwest zigzag, then entering the Columbia upstream from the Columbia River Gorge. It flows through exceptionally scenic canyons in its upper course, with several significant paleontological sites along its banks.

The main branch of the John Day River rises in the Strawberry Mountains in eastern Grant County. The North Fork heads on the western slope of the Elkhorn Mountains in northeastern Grant County. The Middle Fork rises near the crest of the Blue Mountains on the eastern edge of Grant County. The main, south and middle forks each have their heads in different parts of the Malheur National Forest, while the North Fork's source is located within in the Wallowa-Whitman National Forest. The main fork flows initially north, then west through the John Day Valley and through the cities of Prairie City, John Day and Mount Vernon. At Dayville, in western Grant County, it is joined from the south by the South Fork John Day River, then flows north through Picture Gorge and the Sheep Rock Unit of the John Day Fossil Beds National Monument.

At Kimberly in northwestern Grant County, it is joined from the east by the North Fork John Day River (which had already joined with the Middle Fork John Day River above Monument, Grant County, Oregon).  The river then flows west across Wheeler County. At the county line with Jefferson County it flows north, past the Clarno Unit of the John Day Fossil Beds National Monument. As it approaches the Columbia River in north-central Oregon it flows in an increasingly meandering course, forming the boundary between Sherman County to the west and Gilliam County to the east.

Recreation and ecosystem
The John Day is navigable by rafts and other small river craft by boaters who obtain permits provided by the BLM. 

Its lower course is used for irrigation of cropland and ranching. In 1988, the United States Congress designated  of the river from Service Creek to Tumwater Falls as Wild and Scenic for its recreational opportunities. The segment of the river is a popular destination for anadromous steelhead and warm water bass fishing, as well as whitewater rafting.

In addition to wild spring chinook salmon and bass, the river furnishes habitat for Columbia River redband trout, bull trout, and westslope cutthroat trout. There are no hatchery salmon or steelhead released in the John Day River.

See also
List of rivers of Oregon
List of longest streams of Oregon
List of National Wild and Scenic Rivers
Lost Blue Bucket Mine, a lost mine believed to be somewhere on the John Day

References

Works cited

External links

National Park Service: John Day Wild and Scenic River
 National Wild and Scenic Rivers System

Rivers of Oregon
Wild and Scenic Rivers of the United States
Rivers of Grant County, Oregon
Rivers of Wheeler County, Oregon
Rivers of Sherman County, Oregon
Rivers of Gilliam County, Oregon
John Day Fossil Beds National Monument
Malheur National Forest
Umatilla National Forest
Wallowa–Whitman National Forest